Events in the year 2019 in Tajikistan.

Incumbents
President: Emomali Rahmon
Prime Minister: Kokhir Rasulzoda

Events
19 February 2019 – The Tajikistan Football Federation announces that the season will consist of Istiklol, Khujand, Kuktosh, Regar-TadAZ, Khatlon, CSKA Pamir, Panjshir and Istaravshan.

References

 
2010s in Tajikistan
Years of the 21st century in Tajikistan
Tajikistan
Tajikistan